Alessandro Turini (born 14 January 1950) is an Italian former footballer who, playing as a midfielder or forward, made more than 300 appearances in the Italian professional leagues. He played 5 games, scoring once, in Serie A for A.C. Milan during the 1973–74 season, and also played for them in the 1973 European Super Cup and the 1974 European Cup Winners' Cup Final, both of which Milan lost.

References

1950 births
Living people
Italian footballers
Association football forwards
Association football midfielders
Aurora Pro Patria 1919 players
Como 1907 players
A.C. Milan players
Hellas Verona F.C. players
Taranto F.C. 1927 players
F.C. Crotone players
Savona F.B.C. players
Serie A players
Serie B players
Serie C players